A Play for a Passenger (translit. Pyesa dlya passazhira) is a 1995 Russian drama film directed by Vadim Abdrashitov. It was entered into the 45th Berlin International Film Festival where it won the Silver Bear.

Cast
 Sergey Makovetskiy as Oleg
 Igor Livanov as Nikolay 
 Yury Belyayev as Kuzmin
 Irina Sidorova as Marina
 Nelli Nevedina  as Olga
 Yervant Arzumanyan as Ruben, shop owner
 Oksana Mysina as Inna
 Lyubov Germanova as Valentina
 Aleksandra Dorokhina as Lidia
 Natalya Sanzharova as girl in a restaurant

References

External links

1995 films
Russian drama films
1990s Russian-language films
1995 drama films
Films directed by Vadim Abdrashitov